Alan Lee Wirth (born December 8, 1956) is an American former professional baseball pitcher. Wirth pitched in parts of three seasons in Major League Baseball, from 1978 until 1980, for the Oakland Athletics.

Career 
Wirth was originally drafted by the San Francisco Giants in the 3rd round of the 1974 Major League Baseball Draft. After four seasons in its organization, he was part of a 7-for-1 trade in which he along with Gary Thomasson, Gary Alexander, Dave Heaverlo, John Henry Johnson, Phil Huffman and $300,000 were sent to the A's for Vida Blue on March 15, 1978. Mario Guerrero was sent to the Athletics just over three weeks later on April 7 to complete the transaction.

Wirth started the 1978 season with Oakland, but was sent to the minors in June. He also split the next two seasons between the major league A's and their minor league Ogden A's farm team. In all, Wirth pitched in 23 games over three seasons for Oakland before being released during spring training in 1981. He was signed by the Seattle Mariners, and spent the 1981 season with their top farm team, the Spokane Indians. After spending the 1982 season in the Baltimore Orioles and Detroit Tigers organizations, he retired.

Personal life 
Wirth's daughter Christina was an All-American basketball player for the Vanderbilt Commodores, and later played one season for the Indiana Fever. His oldest daughter Alana played basketball at Barry University, and a third daughter, Theresa, played at the University of Denver. His son, Joe, played high school soccer for Mountain View and went on to play for Scottsdale Community College. His youngest daughters, identical twins Jenn and LeeAnne, currently play at Gonzaga University, with Jenn sharing West Coast Conference Player of the Year honors in 2021 with BYU's Shaylee Gonzales.

References

External links
, or Retrosheet, or Pura Pelota (Venezuelan Winter League)

1956 births
Living people
American expatriate baseball players in Canada
American expatriate baseball players in Mexico
Baseball players from Arizona
Birmingham Barons players
Evansville Triplets players
Fresno Giants players
Great Falls Giants players
Major League Baseball pitchers
Mexican League baseball pitchers
Navegantes del Magallanes players
American expatriate baseball players in Venezuela
Oakland Athletics players
Ogden A's players
Rochester Red Wings players
Spokane Indians players
Sportspeople from Mesa, Arizona
Tigres del México players
Vancouver Canadians players
Waterbury Giants players